Cleopatra cridlandi is a species of freshwater snail with an operculum, aquatic gastropod molluscs in the family Paludomidae.

This species is found in Kenya, Tanzania, and Uganda. Its natural habitat is freshwater lakes.

References

Paludomidae
Gastropods described in 1954
Taxonomy articles created by Polbot